Astronotus crassipinnis is a South American fish in the cichlid family from the southern Amazon basin and the Paraná–Paraguay basins. It is not as well-known or common in the aquarium trade as its relative, the more northernly distributed oscar (A. ocellatus).

Etymology
The genus name Astronotus comes from the Greek words "Astra" which means ray and "Noton" means back. The species name crassipinnis comes from the Greek words "Crassus" came from the word fat and "Pinna" means fish.

In the aquarium
The species is very rare in the aquarium hobby, where they are sometimes known as "fat oscars". When they appear, they are often mistaken for the common oscar (A. ocellatus).

References

crassipinnis
Fish described in 1840
Taxa named by Johann Jakob Heckel